Walkersville  High School (WHS) is a four-year public high school in Walkersville, Frederick County, Maryland, United States. The school's colors are blue and gold and athletic teams are known as the "Lions."

Overview

The school is located near the foothills of the Appalachian Mountains of Western Maryland in the town of Walkersville.  The school is located just off Maryland Route 194, east of U.S. 15, and north of Maryland Route 26.

The current building's construction began in 1974 with an addition completed in 1999.

The original building was located where the current Walkersville Middle School resides.

Sports
State Champions

 2016 - Football
 2015 - Unified Track
 2012 - Unified Tennis
 2011 - Boys' Track & Field 
 2010 - Boys' Swim Team
 2010 - Boys' Indoor Track & Field
 2008 - Boys' Track & Field 
 2003 - Baseball 
 2003 - Girls' Basketball 
 1999 - Baseball
 1999 - Softball 
 1996 - Softball
 1987 - Football 
 1986 - Boys' Basketball 
 1984 - Boys' Basketball
 1978 - Baseball
 1972 - Boys' Soccer
 1964 - Boys' Basketball
 1960 - Boys' Basketball

Image gallery
Walkersville High School has been located in several buildings over the years including the three shown below.  The middle image is now Walkersville Middle School.

References and notes

See also
List of high schools in Maryland
Frederick County Public Schools

External links

Walkersville High School website
Map of School from Google Maps

Public high schools in Maryland
Educational institutions established in 1976
Schools in Frederick County, Maryland
1976 establishments in Maryland